Rick Nalatu (born 1 December 1972) is a Fijian rugby union player. He is a winger.

Early and personal life
Nalatu was born in Fiji and moved to Australia when he was 2 years old.

He was educated at the Sandgate State High School in Brisbane. In 1984, he played in the school's undefeated premiership-winning 1st XV.

Rugby career
Nalatu played wing for the Reds, where he made his debut in 2006 against the Sharks. He is famous for RICK NALATU TRY SAVING TACKLE. He was certainly the fastest of the modern day Australian rugby players and one of the fastest rugby players of all time with an official fully automatic timed 10.33 s 100 m pb which still sits around the 30s on the all-time Australian 100 m performances.  With this speed he was a regular on the athletics track at one point at National level, where he was competitive with one of the fastest generations of Australian sprinters including Damien Marsh, Steve Brimacombe and Dean Capobianco.  He competed against US sprint legend Michael Johnson in the 1994 Australian 100 m championships won by Marsh.

References

External links
http://www.eurosport.co.uk/rugby/ricky-nalatu_prs15777/person.shtml

1972 births
Living people
Rugby union wings
Papua New Guinean expatriate rugby union players